In the system of courts of England and Wales, the Crown Court deals with serious criminal charges and with less serious charges where the accused has elected trial at the Crown Court instead of trial at a magistrates' court. The Crown Court also hears appeals against conviction and sentence from magistrates.

Background
The Crown Court system was established by the Courts Act 1971, which came into force on 1 January 1972, following the recommendations of a royal commission chaired by Lord Beeching. Previously, criminal cases that were not dealt with by magistrates were heard by assize courts and courts of quarter sessions, in a system that had changed little in the preceding centuries.  The Crown Court system is administered by His Majesty's Courts and Tribunals Service, an executive agency of the Ministry of Justice. England is divided into six regions by HMCTS (London, Midlands, North East, North West, South East and Western), with the whole of Wales forming a seventh region.

Organisation
In 2007, there were 91 locations in England and Wales at which the Crown Court regularly sat.  Crown Court centres are designated in one of three tiers: first-tier centres are visited by High Court judges for criminal and also for civil cases (in the District Registry of the High Court); second-tier centres are visited by High Court judges for criminal work only; and third-tier centres are not normally visited by High Court judges. High Court judges hear 2% of cases at the Crown Court, but 27% of the most serious (Class 1) cases. Circuit judges and recorders sit at all three tiers, hearing 88% and 10% of the cases respectively. When the Crown Court is conducting a trial, the judge sits with a jury of twelve; when hearing appeals against decisions of a magistrates' court, the judge sits with two (or sometimes four) magistrates.

Place of business
Section 78 of the Supreme Court Act 1981 provides that the Crown Court can conduct business at any location in England and Wales, in accordance with directions given by the Lord Chancellor. This power is sometimes used to enable court sittings to take place away from one of the regular Crown Court venues.  For example, in 2007, a sitting of the Crown Court was held at one of the oldest court buildings in England or Wales, the former courthouse in Beaumaris, Anglesey, which was built in 1614 and closed in 1997.

Crown Court locations

See also
 List of courts in England and Wales
 List of County Court venues in England and Wales

References

External links
 Crown Court - what it does (Directgov, England and Wales)

 
Crown Courts
England and Wales, Crown